is the capital city of Saga Prefecture, located on the island of Kyushu, Japan. Saga was the capital of Saga Domain in the Edo period, and the largest city of former Hizen Province. As of August 1, 2020, the city had an estimated population of 232,736 and a population density of 539 persons per km2. The total area is 431.84 km2.

Saga is located in the southeast part of Saga Prefecture. After the 2005 merger the city became very long north to south, bordering the Ariake Sea to the south and Fukuoka Prefecture to the southeast and north. The northern half of the city contains the Sefuri Mountains. Saga can also be regarded as within the Greater Fukuoka metropolitan area, and by extension, Fukuoka-Kitakyushu Metropolitan Area.

History

Municipal timeline
April 1, 1889 - The modern municipal system was established and the city of Saga is founded. At the same time, the current city region is occupied by 21 villages from three districts. 
Kanzaki District: Hasuike and Mitsuse.
Ogi District: Kitayama and Nanzan.
Saga District: Higashikawasoe, Honjō, Hyōgo, Kamino, Kase, Kasuga, Kawakami, Kinryū, Kitakawasoe, Kose, Kuboizumi, Matsuume, Nabeshima, Nikita, Nishiyoka, Oseki and Takakise.
June 6, 1899 - Kose changed the kanji of its name.
October 1, 1922 - Kamino was incorporated into Saga.
November 3, 1935 - Hasuike was elevated to town status.
March 31, 1954 - Hyōgo, Kase, Kose, Nishiyoka and Takakise were all incorporated into Saga.
October 1, 1954 - Honjō, Kinryū, Kitakawasoe, Kuboizumi and Nabeshima were all incorporated into Saga.
March 1, 1955 - Higashikawasoe and Nikita were merged to create the town of Morodomi.
October 1, 2005 - The towns of Fuji, Morodomi and Yamato (all from Saga District) and the village of Mitsuse (from Kanzaki District) merged with Saga. (population: 206,967 ; area: 355.15 km2)
October 1, 2007 - The towns of Higashiyoka, Kawasoe, and Kubota (all from Saga District) were all incorporated into Saga. (population: roughly 240,000 ; area: 431.42 km2)  Saga District was dissolved as a result of this merger.

Saga Castle
Standing out from many cultural assets is the plains castle within the city, Saga Castle. It is one of the rare castles in Japan surrounded by a wall rather than built on one. First built between 1591 and 1593, there was a fire in 1726. Renovated in 1728, there was yet another fire in 1835. Nabeshima Naomasa, daimyō of the Nabeshima clan, renovated it within two years and moved in. In 1874 it was a court building and a prefectural office. 1883 saw it become a junior school. The buildings were eventually replaced by modern school buildings.

Geography
Saga City is located in the southeast portion of Saga Prefecture. After the 2005 merger the city became very long north to south. It now borders the Ariake Sea to the south and Fukuoka Prefecture to the southeast and north. The northern half of the city contains the Sefuri Mountains.

Climate
Saga has a humid subtropical climate (Köppen climate classification Cfa).The annual average precipitation ranges from about 1800 mm (71 in) in the city center to about 2400 mm (94 in) in Mitsuse. The annual average temperature ranges from about 13 °C (55 °F) in Mitsuse to 17 °C (63 °F) in the city center.

Adjoining municipalities

Saga Prefecture
Kanzaki
Karatsu
Ogi
Taku  
Fukuoka Prefecture
Fukuoka
Sawara-ku, Fukuoka
Itoshima
Ōkawa
Yanagawa

Education

Universities

National
Saga University

Private
Saga Junior College
Saga Women's Junior College

Senior High Schools

Prefectural
Chienkan High School 
Koshikan Senior High School
Saga Commercial High School
Saga Higashi High School
Saga Kita High School
Saga Nishi High School
Saga Technical High School

Private
Hokuryo High School
Kōgakukan High School
Saga Gakuen High School
Saga Ryukoku
Saga Seiwa High School
Saga Girls' High School

Transportation

Air
There is one airport inside the city of Saga, Saga Airport, located in the former town of Kawasoe. Before the opening of Saga Airport, Fukuoka Airport was the nearest airport. However, many people in Saga still use Fukuoka Airport due its greater number of routes and flights offered. There is an express bus which connects the two airports.

Rail

JR Kyushu
Nagasaki Main Line
Igaya Station - Saga Station - Nabeshima Station - Balloon Saga Station (only in operation during the Saga International Balloon Fiesta) - Kubota Station
Karatsu Line 
Kubota Station

Road
Expressways
Nagasaki Expressway
Interchanges: Saga Yamato Interchange
Other facilities: Kinryū Service Area
National highways
Route 34 ("Hokubu Bypass")
Route 207
Route 208 ("Nambu Bypass")
Route 263
Toll section: Mitsuse Tunnel
Yamato Roadside Station
Route 264
Route 323
Route 444

Attractions 
Every fall Saga holds the "Saga International Balloon Fiesta" in the dry riverbed of the Kase River. A quarter of the visitors are from Saga. The number of visitors was about 15 million in 2005. Hot air balloonists from many countries enter this event.

Kakurintei Tea House located in the grounds of Kono Koen is a very quaint and picturesque Japanese tea house overlooking a pond.

Saga Castle (Also called the Saga Castle Historical Museum) is the largest reconstruction of a wooden building in Japan, with a total floor space of 2500 square meters and the historical atmosphere of the Saga Castle main keep.

Famous People from Saga 
Shigeo Shingo, an industrial engineer who distinguished himself as one of the world's leading experts on manufacturing practices.
Hidenori Chiwata, a singer whose song カサブタ (Kasabuta / "Scab") was used as a theme song in the anime Zatch Bell!.
Hanawa, singer and comedian. He released a CD about Saga city 
Yasuko Matsuyuki, singer and actress known for her glamorous and sophisticated personality.  She is mentioned in Hanawa's song as being one of the celebrities that won't admit being from Saga.  She moved away from Saga at the age of 19 to be a model.
 Yuna Katsuki (born Yohei Matsuyuki), singer and musician, of Lazy Knack, RED, The Flare, and Candelars, and also the younger brother of Yasuko Matsuyuki.  He freely admits being from Saga, unlike his sister. Yuna's Official Website He moved to Tokyo at the age of 16.
Egashira 2:50, a comedian
Noriko Nakagoshi, an actress
Ikumi Yoshimatsu, Miss International 2012
Rikako Sakata, actress known for Miu Kazashiro in Kamen Rider Fourze
Saburō Sakai, Japanese naval aviator and flying ace

Economy/Industry 
In the areas surrounding the city, the agricultural industry focuses on planting grains that make use of water. The fishery centers on seaweed cultivation using the Ariake Sea.

Originally one of the largest rice-producing areas, a large farmland has been converted it into a vegetable field in response to changes in the environment surrounding agriculture. In terms of industry, the terrain is facing the Ariake Sea, but since it is a shallow area where large vessels cannot navigate, heavy industry has not developed much. In addition, in the first half of the 20th century, coal and prefecture western flourished because there was not much competition.

On the other hand, the food industry and the textile industry have developed throughout the late 20th century. Although the food industry is still strong, the textile industry has been the main industry since the 1970s. However, since the 1990s the automobile parts industry has been growing due to the accumulation of automobiles and parts industry in northern Kyushu.

Although it is located at the prefecture capital and the service industry accounts for a large number of employees, the shipping industry in commerce is not particularly large compared to other cities of the same size. Currently, three large suburban commercial facilities with a sales floor area of 50,000 m2 are in competition with each other, and there is an unbalanced demand for supply.

The number of companies with head offices and main offices in the city is the largest in the prefecture, but it is not that much compared to the neighboring prefectures. There is also the tendency of branch offices to be in urban cities, which is often prefecture capitals.

In terms of percent by industry, the tertiary industry exceeds 70%, but it is the lowest among the seven prefectures of Kyushu. The proportion of secondary industries is small, while the proportion of primary industry is relatively high. (Census data: October 1, 2005)

Twin towns – sister cities

Saga is twinned with:

 Cussac-Fort-Médoc, France
 Glens Falls, United States (since 1988)
 Lianyungang, China
 Warren County, United States (since 1988)
 Yeonje (Busan), South Korea

References

External links 

  
  
 About the Hagakure the Castle 
 Saga International Balloon Fiesta 
 

 
Cities in Saga Prefecture
2005 establishments in Japan